Abraham Mapu (1808 in Vilijampolė, Kaunas1867 in Königsberg, Prussia) was a Lithuanian novelist. He wrote in Hebrew as part of the Haskalah (enlightenment) movement. His novels, with their lively plots encompassing heroism, adventure and romantic love in Biblical settings, contributed to the rise of the Zionist movement.

Biography
Born into a Jewish family, as a child Mapu studied in a cheder where his father served as a teacher. He married in 1825.

For many years he was an impoverished, itinerant schoolmaster. Mapu gained financial security when he was appointed teacher in a government school for Jewish children. He worked as a teacher in various towns and cities, joined the Haskalah movement, and studied German, French and Russian. He also studied Latin from a translation of the Bible to that language, given him by his local rabbi.

He returned in 1848 to Kaunas and self-published his first historical novel, Ahavat Zion. This is considered one of the first Hebrew novels. He began work on it in 1830 but completed it only in 1853. Unable to fully subsist on his book sales, he relied on the support of his brother, Matisyahu. In 1867 he moved to Königsberg due to illness, published his last book, Amon Pedagogue (Amon means something like Mentor), and died there.

Evaluation
Mapu is considered the first Hebrew novelist. Influenced by French Romanticism, he wrote intricately plotted stories about life in ancient Israel, which he contrasted favorably with 19th-century Jewish life. His style is fresh and poetic, almost Biblical in its simple grandeur.

Legacy
The romantic-nationalistic ideas in his novels later inspired David Ben-Gurion and others active in the leadership of the modern Zionist movement that led to the establishment of the state of Israel. The American Hebrew poet, Gabriel Preil, references Mapu in one of his works, and focuses on the two writers' native Lithuania.

Novels 
 Ahavat Zion (1853) (Amnon, Prince and Peasant as translated by F. Jaffe in 1887)
 Ayit Tzavua (1858) (Hypocrite Eagle)
 Ashmat Shomron (1865) (Guilt of Samaria)

Commemorations 
Streets bearing his name are found in the Kaunas Old Town and in the Israeli cities of Jerusalem, Tel Aviv, and Kiriat Ata. A well-known Israeli novel called "The Children from Mapu Street" ("הילדים מרחוב מאפו") also celebrates his name. In Kaunas A. Mapu street a joyful statue of A. Mapu with a book in his hand was established by the sculpture Martynas Gaubas in 2019.

References

External links

 Mapu's works (Hebrew) at Project Ben-Yehuda
 Abraham Mapu (English) at the Institute for the Translation of Hebrew Literature
 
 

1808 births
1867 deaths
Jewish novelists
Lithuanian male writers
Lithuanian Jews
Modern Hebrew writers
19th-century novelists
Lithuanian novelists
Male novelists
19th-century Lithuanian writers
19th-century male writers
Writers of historical fiction set in antiquity
Writers of historical romances
Historical novelists
Writers from Kaunas
People of the Haskalah